The women's 63 kg judo competition at the 2008 Summer Paralympics was held on September 8 at the Beijing Workers' Gymnasium. Preliminary rounds started at 12:00 pm CST. Repechage finals, semifinals, bouts for bronze medals, and the final were held at 5:00 pm CST.

This event was the third-heaviest of the women's judo weight classes, limiting competitors to a maximum of 63 kilograms of body mass. Like all other judo events, bouts lasted five minutes. If the bout was still tied at the end, it was extended for another five-minute, sudden-death period; if neither judoka scored during that period, the match is decided by the judges. The tournament bracket consisted of a single-elimination contest culminating in a gold medal match. There was also a repechage to determine the winners of the two bronze medals. Each judoka who had lost to a semifinalist competed in the repechage. The two judokas who lost in the semifinals faced the winner of the opposite half of the bracket's repechage in bronze medal bouts.

Medalists

Tournament results

Repechage

References

External links
 

W63
Judo at the Summer Paralympics Women's Half Middleweight
Paralympics W63